Mesopsocus is a genus of middle barklice in the family Mesopsocidae. There are more than 60 described species in Mesopsocus.

Species
These 67 species belong to the genus Mesopsocus:

 Mesopsocus acutilobus Broadhead & Richards, 1982
 Mesopsocus alatus Broadhead & Richards, 1982
 Mesopsocus angolanus (Badonnel, 1977)
 Mesopsocus apterus Kaplin, 1990
 Mesopsocus atlasicus Badonnel, 1945
 Mesopsocus badhysi Kaplin, 1990
 Mesopsocus balachowskyi Badonnel, 1984
 Mesopsocus blancae Baz, 1988
 Mesopsocus boops (Hagen, 1859)
 Mesopsocus bousemani (Mockford, 2005)
 Mesopsocus brachyonematus (Li, 2002)
 Mesopsocus broadheadi Badonnel, 1982
 Mesopsocus carthaginensis Lienhard, 1988
 Mesopsocus clarki Badonnel, 1982
 Mesopsocus corniculatus (Li, 2002)
 Mesopsocus curvimarginatus (Li, 2002)
 Mesopsocus deserticus Garcia Aldrete, 1999
 Mesopsocus dichotomus (Li, 2002)
 Mesopsocus difficilis Broadhead & Richards, 1982
 Mesopsocus diopsis Enderlein, 1902
 Mesopsocus dislobus Yoshizawa, 1998
 Mesopsocus duboscqui Badonnel, 1938
 Mesopsocus enderleini Badonnel, 1982
 Mesopsocus fenestristigma (Badonnel, 1977)
 Mesopsocus fuscifrons Meinander, 1966
 Mesopsocus gabonensis Badonnel, 1977
 Mesopsocus giganteus Lienhard, 1995
 Mesopsocus graecus Lienhard, 1981
 Mesopsocus gynevolans Lienhard, 2009
 Mesopsocus helveticus Lienhard, 1977
 Mesopsocus hiemalis Marikowskii, 1957
 Mesopsocus hongkongensis Thornton, 1959
 Mesopsocus immunis (Stephens, 1836)
 Mesopsocus incomitatus Smithers, 1957
 Mesopsocus jiensis (Li, 2002)
 Mesopsocus jinicus (Li, 2002)
 Mesopsocus kopetdaghensis Kaplin, 1992
 Mesopsocus laricolus (Li, 2002)
 Mesopsocus laterimaculatus Ball, 1937
 Mesopsocus laticeps (Kolbe, 1880)
 Mesopsocus latreillei Badonnel, 1982
 Mesopsocus lienhardi Badonnel, 1982
 Mesopsocus marikovskyi Badonnel, 1982
 Mesopsocus meinanderi Badonnel, 1982
 Mesopsocus mockfordi Badonnel, 1982
 Mesopsocus montinus Enderlein, 1907
 Mesopsocus neimongolicus (Li, 2002)
 Mesopsocus nigrimaculatus (Li, 2002)
 Mesopsocus nigrostigma Badonnel, 1977
 Mesopsocus nitidifrons Broadhead & Richards, 1982
 Mesopsocus phaeodematus Li, 2002
 Mesopsocus propinquus Broadhead & Richards, 1982
 Mesopsocus salignus (Li, 2002)
 Mesopsocus similis Badonnel, 1977
 Mesopsocus smithersi Badonnel, 1982
 Mesopsocus stenopterus (Li, 2002)
 Mesopsocus strongylotus (Li, 2002)
 Mesopsocus tetensi Badonnel, 1982
 Mesopsocus thorntoni Badonnel, 1982
 Mesopsocus troodos Lienhard, 1995
 Mesopsocus tumorosus Smithers, 1957
 Mesopsocus unipunctatus (Müller, 1764)
 Mesopsocus vernus Lienhard, 1977
 Mesopsocus wardi Meinander, 1973
 Mesopsocus yemenitus Lienhard, 1988
 Mesopsocus yeni New, 1991
 Mesopsocus ypsilon Ball, 1937

References

External links

 

Mesopsocidae
Articles created by Qbugbot
Psocoptera genera